Dora Boothby defeated Agnes Morton 6–4, 4–6, 8–6 in the all comers' final to win the ladies' singles tennis title at the 1909 Wimbledon Championships. The reigning champion Charlotte Sterry did not defend her title.

Draw

All comers' finals

Top half

Section 1

Section 2

Bottom half

Section 3

Section 4

References

External links

Women's Singles
Wimbledon Championship by year – Women's singles
Wimbledon Championships - Singles
Wimbledon Championships - Singles